Alexander Christoffersen Blonz (born 17 April 2000) is a Norwegian handball player for SC Pick Szeged and the Norwegian national team.

He made his international debut during the Gjensidige Cup 2019 against Netherlands where he scored 7 goals and was elected best player of the game.

He made his World Championship debut in the 2019 World Men's Handball Championship against Tunisia. Four days later and in only his fourth game with the norwegian handball national team, he scored 8 goals against Chile and was elected best player of the game.

He represented Norway at the 2021 World Men's Handball Championship.

His first name is often misspelled as Alexandre, due to his French heritage.

Achievements
World Championship:
: 2019
 European Championship:
: 2020
Norwegian League:
Winner: 2019/2020, 2020/2021
Norwegian Cup:
Winner: 2019, 2020
Hungarian League:
Winner: 2021/2022

Individual awards
 Best Rookie of Eliteserien: 2019/2020
 Best World Young Left Wing (generation 1998 and younger): 2019/2020

References

External links

2000 births
Living people
Norwegian male handball players
Sportspeople from Stavanger
Norwegian expatriate sportspeople in Hungary